Ila Auto is a Spellemannprisen winning bluegrass band from Oslo, Norway. The band was established in 2005.

Discography 
 If You Keep Pickin' it Might Never Heal (Auto Records, 2006)
 Over the Next Hill (Auto Records, 2008)
 Ila Auto (Auto Records, 2010)

References

External links 
Ila Auto official site

Spellemannprisen winners
Norwegian bluegrass music groups
Musical groups established in 2005
2005 establishments in Norway
Musical groups from Oslo